The Junior men's race at the 1982 IAAF World Cross Country Championships was held in Rome, Italy, at the Ippodromo delle Capannelle on March 21, 1982.   A report on the event was given in the Glasgow Herald.

Complete results, medallists, 
 and the results of British athletes were published.

Race results

Junior men's race (7.926 km)

Individual

Teams

Note: Athletes in parentheses did not score for the team result

Participation
An unofficial count yields the participation of 93 athletes from 17 countries in the Junior men's race.  This is in agreement with the official numbers as published.

 (5)
 (6)
 (6)
 (4)
 (6)
 (6)
 (6)
 (5)
 (6)
 (6)
 (4)
 (6)
 (6)
 (4)
 (6)
 (6)
 (5)

See also
 1982 IAAF World Cross Country Championships – Senior men's race
 1982 IAAF World Cross Country Championships – Senior women's race

References

Junior men's race at the World Athletics Cross Country Championships
IAAF World Cross Country Championships
1982 in youth sport